Tiriel, Op. 41, (Russian: Тириэль) is a 1985 opera by the Russian composer Dmitri Smirnov in three acts (9 scenes) with a symphonic prologue to his own English libretto after a poem of the same title by William Blake. It has been translated into Russian and German. It was first performed at the Stadttheater Freiburg on 28 January 1989.

Creation history
The opera was composed from 1983 until 1985 in Moscow, Russia. The libretto combines the text from Blake's early symbolic work "Tiriel" (c. 1789) with the addition of five of his poems: the "Introduction" and "The Divine Image" from the Songs of Innocence (1789), "The Tyger" and "A Divine Image" from the Songs of Experience (1789-1794), and "A Cradle Song" from his Note-book (Manuscript Rossetti, 1793).

Performance history

The premiere took place at the Stadttheater Freiburg on 28 January 1989.

 German translation: 
 Stage director: Siegfried Schoenbohm
 Decorations: Brigitte Friesz
 Costumes: Renate Schmitzer
 Choreography: Krisztina Horvath
 Conductor: Gerchard Markson

Roles
Tiriel, the old and blind king – baritone: Rudolf Kostas
Har, his father – tenor: George Maran
Heva, his mother – soprano: Melinda Liebermann
Ijim, his brother – tenor: Grant Wollaber
Zazel, his brother – bass: Jasse Ciston/Friedemann Kunder
Hela, his daughter – soprano: Annette Robbert
Mnetha, nurse of Har and Heva – contralto: Kathrin Asman
Myratana, Tiriel's wife – silent role: Elke Buerger
Nightingale – dancer: Antoinette Laurent
Tiger – dancer: Mauno Hyvaerinen
Tiriel's sons (and daughter) – male chorus (or mixed chorus)
Zasel's sons – male chorus
Birds and flowers – dancers

Time and Place: at the dawn of time

Duration 113 minutes.

Synopsis
The blind and aged king, Tiriel, calls down curses on his sons whom he has summoned to observe their mother's death. The sons bury their mother, but declare that they have tired of their father's tyranny and now will rebel against it. So Tiriel sets off wandering into the mountains.

Eventually he comes to the ‘pleasant gardens' in the Vales of Har, where he finds his own parents, Har and Heva, who are both quite senile and have become like children again. They invite Tiriel to help them catch birds and listen to Har's singing in the "great cage". In madness and dismay, Tiriel abandons them and sets out further on his wanderings.

Tiriel's wild brother Ijim finds him, captures him and takes him back to his children who are living in what once was his own palace. Tiriel, ever madder and more enraged, curses his children yet more passionately, calling down thunder and pestilence and destroying them. Doing so, he sends his favourite daughter Hela mad. Nonetheless it is Hela who must guide Tiriel back to his parents in the Vales of Har.

On the way through the mountains they pass caves which are the home of another of Tiriel's brothers, Zazel. Zazel, together with his sons, hurls dirt and stones at Tiriel and his daughter. Eventually Tiriel and Hela arrive once more at the tent in the Vales of Har, where Har and Heva live. In a final speech, Tiriel explains how his father's laws and his own wisdom now "end together in a curse". Cursing his parents, he dies. Over Tiriel's body the goddess Mnetha sings a lullaby to the mankind who sleeps forever.

Quotations
"It is important when presenting works like Tiriel in the West not to apologize for what might seem to be naïve. Russians feel the way they do because they want to, not because they can't do anything else. In this respect, the Freiburgers' musical performance struck me as exemplary..." (Gerard McBurney)

Scoring
Singers and actors: 7 singers; male chorus; actress; dancers;
Orchestra: 3 flutes, 3 oboes, 3 clarinets, 2 saxophones, 3 bassoons, 4 French horns, 3 trumpets, 3 trombones, tuba, 4 to 5 percussion players (5 timpani, triangle, sonagli, cymbals, 3 gongs, claves, 3 temple blocks, 2 wood blocks, 2 bongos, 5 tom-toms, tambourin, side drum, guiro, bambusi, lion's roar, cassa rulante, bass drum, tam-tam, crotales, flexatone, tubular bells, glockenspiel, xylophone, vibraphone), celesta, harp, and strings.

Publishers
Boosey & Hawkes, London, and Internationale Musikverlage Hans Sikorski, Hamburg

External links
Details at Boosey & Hawkes
Libretto at Wikilivres.ru
Video at YouTube

English-language operas
Operas
Operas by Dmitri Smirnov
Operas based on literature
1989 operas
Adaptations of works by William Blake